Mac Diarmada (anglicised as MacDermot or McDermott), also spelled Mac Diarmata, is an Irish surname, and the surname of the ruling dynasty of Moylurg, a kingdom that existed in Connacht from the 10th to 16th centuries. The last ruling king was Tadhg mac Diarmata, who ruled until 1585.

Naming conventions

History

The progenitor of the family was Dermot mac Tadhg Mor, 7th King of Moylurg, who reigned from 1124 to 1159. He was a vassal and kinsman of the Ó Conchubhair, Kings of Connacht; their common ancestor was Tadg mac Cathal, King of Connacht from 925 to 956. They were based at McDermott's Castle, Lough Key.

Later offshoot septs of the dynasty included the families of MacDermot Roe.

Moylurg ceased to exist as a kingdom in the late 16th century, though the senior line of the MacDermot's continued to live a sometime poverty-stricken and precarious existence despite land confiscations and the oppression of the Penal Laws. During this era they were popularly accorded the title Prince of Coolavin; the current incumbent is Francis MacDermot, who succeeded by birthright to his father Rory MacDermot who died on 6 May 2021.

Variants

Variations of the name include :

 McDermott, MacDermott
 MacDiarmada, MacDiarmata
 MacDermot Roe, MacDermott Roe
 McDermitt
 McDermett
 McDiarmid, MacDiarmid, Irish and Scottish language variants ultimately from Irish
 MacDormand 
 Kermode, Manx language variant
 Kermit, variant of Kermode

and others.

People

McDermot
 Conchobair MacDermot
 Dermot MacDermot
 Frank MacDermot
 Galt MacDermot (1928–2018), Canadian-American composer, pianist
 Hugh Hyacinth O'Rorke MacDermot
 Niall MacDermot
 Niall Anthony MacDermot
 Rory MacDermot
 Tomaltach na Cairge MacDermot

McDermott
 Alice McDermott, writer
 Alister McDermott, cricketer
 Andrew McDermott (singer) (born 1966), English singer
Andrew McDermott (footballer) (1889–1915), Scottish footballer
 Andy McDermott, author
 Bill McDermott, executive
 Brian McDermott (disambiguation), several people
 Brian McDermott (rugby league), rugby coach
 Brian McDermott (footballer), football manager of Reading F.C.
 Brian McDermott (murder victim), child who was murdered in Belfast in 1973
 Bobby McDermott, basketball player
 Charles McDermott (disambiguation), several people
 Charlie McDermott, American actor
 Chris McDermott (born 1963), Australian rule player from South Australia
 Christopher McDermott (born 1989), British handball player and coach, Olympian London 2012
 Craig McDermott, cricketer
 David McDermott, English footballer
 Dean McDermott (born 1966), Canadian-American actor
 Doug McDermott (born 1992), American basketball player; son of Greg McDermott (see below)
 Drew McDermott, computer scientist
 Dylan McDermott (born 1961), American actor
 Eoghan McDermott (born 1983), Irish radio and television presenter
 Eugene McDermott, geophysicist, philanthropist; co-founder, Chairman, Director of Texas Instruments
 Gerald McDermott, American author, illustrator, graphic designer, and film maker
 Greg McDermott (born 1964), American basketball coach
 Helen McDermott, British radio and television presenter, best known for her work at Anglia Television
 James McDermott (disambiguation), several people
 James J. McDermott, Jr., former CEO and Chairman of Keefe, Bruyette & Woods
 Jim McDermott (born 1936), American politician
 John McDermott (disambiguation), several people
 John McDermott (golfer), American golfer
 Joseph McDermott (disambiguation), several people
 Kathleen McDermott (born 1977), Scottish actress, singer, model, and make-up artist
 Kevin McDermott (disambiguation), several people
 Kevin McDermott (singer–songwriter), Scottish singer-songwriter
 Kevin McDermott (American football), American football player
 Lloyd McDermott, Australia's first indigenous barrister and rugby union player
 Melissa McDermott, CBS news anchor and reporter
 Michael McDermott (disambiguation), several people
 Michael McDermott, software engineer who carried out the 2000 Wakefield massacre
 Michael McDermott (musician), Chicago singer-songwriter
 Mickey McDermott, baseball pitcher
 Mike McDermott (disambiguation), several people
 Neale McDermott, football player
 Neil McDermott (born 1980), British actor
 Nicola McDermott (born 1996), Australian olympic highjumper
 Nora McDermott (1927–2013), Canadian basketball and volleyball player, coach and physical education teacher
 Patrick McDermott (disambiguation)
 Paul McDermott, Australian comedian
 Paul Francis McDermott (born 1965), Australian electro-pop musician, performs as Paul Mac
 Phelim McDermott (born 1963), English actor and stage director
 Robert McDermott (disambiguation), several people
 Roe McDermott, Irish film critic, younger brother of Eoghan
 Ted McDermott (Thomas McDermott) nicknamed Songaminute Man, Vocalist and Entertainer, "The Songaminute Man"
 Terry McDermott (disambiguation), several people
 Terry McDermott, football player
 Thomas McDermott (disambiguation), several people
 Tracey McDermott, acting chief executive of Britain's Financial Conduct Authority (FCA)
 William Dermott Molloy McDermott, Roman Catholic bishop

MacDermott
Ambrose MacDermott, Bishop of Elphin from 1707 to 1717
 Cormac MacDermott
 G. H. MacDermott
 John MacDermott, Baron MacDermott
 Mercia MacDermott (born 1927), English writer and historian
 Seán Mac Diarmada,  Seán MacDermott

Places
 McDermott Field, a baseball stadium in Idaho that was replaced by Melaleuca Field
 McDermott, Ohio, a census-designated place in western Rush Township, Scioto County, Ohio, United States.

See also
 Kings of Uí Díarmata
 Dermott (disambiguation)
 Irish nobility
 Irish royal families

References

External links
MacDermot Clan Association website
MacDermot (No.1) family pedigree by John O'Hart
McDermott DNA Project

Irish families
Irish-language surnames
MacDermot family
Surnames of Irish origin
Patronymic surnames
Surnames from given names
Gaels